Carmenta bassiformis, the eupatorium borer moth or ironweed clearwing moth, is a moth of the family Sesiidae. It was described by Francis Walker in 1856, and is found in the United States from Massachusetts to Florida, west to Wisconsin, Kansas and Texas.

The wingspan is 18–26 mm. Adults are on wing from late May to September.

The larvae feed on the roots of ironweed and Joe-Pye weed.

References

External links
mothphotographersgroup

Sesiidae
Moths described in 1856